Lu Shibi (8 July 1930 - 28 March 2020) was a Chinese orthopedist who was director of the PLA Institute of Orthopaedics. He was a professor and chief physician of the PLA General Hospital. He was master supervisor and doctoral supervisor at the Medical College, Nankai University.

Biography
Lu was born in Yichang, Hubei, on July 8, 1930. His father Lu Yongchun was a tuberculosis specialist. In 1948 he was accepted to Tsinghua University, three years later, he transferred to Peking Union Medical College. After graduation, he worked at the university. In 1958, he was dispatched to the PLA General Hospital. On March 28, 2020, he died of illness in Beijing, aged 89.

Selected papers

Honours and awards
 1996 Member of the Chinese Academy of Engineering (CAE)
 1997 Science and Technology Progress Award of the Ho Leung Ho Lee Foundation

References

External links
 Biography of Lu Shibi on CCTV

1930 births
2020 deaths
People from Yichang
Engineers from Hubei
Tsinghua University alumni
Peking Union Medical College alumni
Academic staff of Nankai University
Members of the Chinese Academy of Engineering